John Paddock (born 1954) is a Canadian ice hockey coach and former player.

John Paddock may also refer to:

 John Paddock (footballer) (1876–1965), English footballer
 John Paddock (priest) (born 1951), English Anglican priest and Dean of Gibraltar
 John A. Paddock (1825–1894), American Episcopal bishop